InvestiRE SGR is an independent real estate asset management firm with approximately €7 billion in assets under management as of June 2016. The company is the result of the merger of three real estate asset management companies: Investire Immobiliare SGR, Polaris Real Estate SGR and Beni Stabili Gestioni SGR. The real estate portfolio managed by InvestiRE is located all over Italy, across different market sectors, including office, retail, healthcare and social housing.

Shareholding Structure

The main shareholders of the companies are Beni Stabili, the listed owner of the former Beni Stabili Gestioni SGR, Banca Finnat, Fondazione Cariplo, Italian surveyors' pension scheme CIPAG and Fondazione Cassa di dei Risparmi di Forlì.

Portfolio Strategies
InvestiRE's portfolio is composed of long term office and residential investments as well as development projects in the Social Housing sector and special purpose buildings. In 2015, as part of a portfolio rotation strategy, InvestiRE has sold a number of assets in Italy to primary international real estate investors.

References

External links
Official website (English)

Companies based in Rome
Italian companies established in 2015